Radstock West railway station was a station on the Bristol and North Somerset Railway in the county of Bath and North East Somerset in England.

History
Opened as Radstock on 3 September 1873, the station was renamed Radstock West on 26 September 1949, and closed on 2 November 1959. It was located immediately to the southwest of the Somerset and Dorset Joint Railway's station,  (1874-1966).

Concurrently with the closure of the S&DJR on 7 March 1966, a connection was made to the S&DJR. This allowed trains on the former B&NSR to traverse a short spur through Radstock North to the Lower Writhlington, Braysdown and Writhlington collieries, to transport coal to Portishead power station. After the last coal from the Somerset Coalfield was extracted from Writhlington Colliery on 28 September 1973, the spur was dismantled.

References

Disused railway stations in Bristol, Bath and South Gloucestershire
Former Great Western Railway stations
Railway stations in Great Britain opened in 1873
Railway stations in Great Britain closed in 1959